Big When Far, Small When Close is the third studio album by Japanese band eX-Girl, released on the PARANOIZ label in Japan (PAR-50024), and by KIKI Poo Records in the US (KPCD-001).

The line-up consisted of Chihiro, Kirilo and Fuzuki, and the album was produced by Hoppy Kamiyama.

Several of the tracks are sung a capella apart from the odd chime, triangle or hand clap. Exceptions are Zozoi with its tribal-esque drumming, Dandera Korabatten with some repeated background instrumentation, and Alabama Song with a carnival-esque brass and clarinet arrangement.

Track listing
 "Neanderthal & Cro-Magnon" (Lyrics: Kirilo, Hoppy Kamiyama / Music: Kamiyama) – 0:50
 "Souvlaki" (Lyrics: eX-Girl, Kamiyama / Music: eX-Girl, Kamiyama) – 4:26
 "Zozoi" (Lyrics: Kirilo / Music: eX-Girl) – 4:28
 "Jet Mogura" (Lyrics: Kirilo / Music: eX-Girl, Kamiyama) – 3:20
 "Dandera Korabatten" (Lyrics: Chihiro / Music: eX-Girl, Kamiyama) – 3:51
 "Disco 3000" (Lyrics: Chihiro / Music: eX-Girl, Kamiyama) – 3:19
 "Alabama Song" (Lyrics: Bertolt Brecht / Music: Kurt Weill) – 3:52
 "Big When Far, Small When Close" (Lyrics: Kamiyama / Music: eX-Girl) – 1:12

Personnel
 Chihiro – vocals, hand claps, stepping.
 Kirilo – vocals, hand claps, stepping.
 Fuzuki – vocals, hand claps, stepping, bell.
 Hoppy Kamiyama – floor tom, cymbal, sample, gram pot.
 Masafumi Minato – floor tom, tom-tom, cymbal.
 Takerô Sekijima – tuba, trombone, trumpet.
 Kanji Nakao – clarinet, trombone, wood block.

Production
 Hoppy Kamiyama – record producer.
 Takerô Sekijima – brass arrangement.
 Jin Terada – recording and mixing November 8–11, 13, 14 1999 at MIT studio, Sound Atelier.
 Yoshiaki Kondo – mastering at Kojima Recordings.
 Kazvnori Akita – graphic design.
 Jimmy Henda – photography.
 Yukari Terakura – costumes.
 eX-Girl – illustrations.
 Ray - illustration (Frog Prince).

EX-Girl albums
2000 albums